The Philippines participated in the 2006 Asian Games held in Doha, Qatar; for the 15th straight time in the same number of stagings of the Games. The country did not participate in Men's and Women's Basketball for the first time due to the continuing suspension by International Basketball Federation (Fédération Internationale de Basketball or FIBA).

The country was represented by 233 athletes participating in 31 sports, including boxing, cue sports, and taekwondo which brought the most medals to the country.

Medalists

Gold

Silver

Bronze

Multiple

Medal summary

Medal by sports

Participation details

Baseball

The 2005 Southeast Asian Games (SEA Games) gold medallists and Southeast Asian powerhouse competed in the Baseball competitions of this edition of the Asian Games, and went up against World Baseball Classic (WBC) champions Japan, Korea, China, Chinese Taipei, and Thailand.

The country finished last in the field after an upset by neighbor Thailand in their last match, 1-8.

Standings

Results

 Match 2: vs  Japan (JPN)
Game time: November 29 13:30 (UTC+3)
Venue: Al-Rayyan Sports Club

 Match 4: vs  China (CHN)
Game time: November 30 13:30 (UTC+3)
Venue: Al-Rayyan Sports Club

 Match 7: vs  Korea Republic (KOR)
Game time: December 3 09:00(UTC+3)
Venue: Al-Rayyan Sports Club

 Match 12: vs  Chinese Taipei (TPE)
Game time: December 5 13:30(UTC+3)
Venue: Al-Rayyan Sports Club

 Match 13: vs  Thailand (THA)
Game time: December 6 09:00 (UTC+3)
Venue: Al-Rayyan Sports Club

Boxing

Seven amateur boxers compete for 11 gold medals at stake in this edition of the Asiad. Two out of the eight boxers are gold medal winners in the last 2005 SEA Games. Four boxers qualified for the semifinals and two boxers reached the final bouts slated on the 13th of December.

Standings

Bout details

Legend:
PTS - Points,  RSCOS - Referee Stop Contest Outscored,  R - Round

Gymnastics Artistic

The country was represented by a lone male gymnast, Roel Ramirez. He qualified for the Finals of Men's Vault Event, and finished sixth in the field.

Results

Sepaktakraw

As released by the DAGOC at the same date at the Games website, the Philippines will be joined by Southeast Asian neighbors Indonesia and Malaysia in Group C in Men's Regu, and Thailand, Myanmar, and Japan in Group A in Women's Regu. The nation competes also with Thailand and Indonesia in Group A of Men's Doubles, and Thailand, Vietnam, and China in Women's Doubles.

Swimming

Ten swimmers represented the country in the competitions in this edition of the Games.

Entry List

 UY Kendrick
 COAKLEY Daniel 
 MOLINA Miguel
 AGUILAR Johansen Benedict
 ARABEJO Ryan Paolo
 WALSH James

 DEE Ernest Lorenzo 
 BORDADO Gerard 
 TOTTEN Erica 
 GANDIONCO Maria Giorgina 
 CORDERO Denjylie

Results

Taekwondo

Twelve taekwondo jins represented the country in the competitions for this edition of the Asiad.
The team accumulated five medals: two silvers and three bronzes, marking the best showing of the country (so far) in the sport in this quadrennial event.

Standings

Withdrawn events

Softball: The 2005 SEA Games gold medallists and Southeast Asian powerhouse was reported to participate in the Games, however current revisions on the schedule reflect otherwise.
Water Polo: As released by the Doha Asian Games Organizing Committee (DAGOC) last September 7, 2006 at the Games website, the 2005 SEA Games silver medallists was supposed to compete in this sport, however, the country was not able to send a team due to priority given to the baseball team, as the lone team sport contingent to the Games. The supposed-to-be opponents of the team in Group A will be awarded automatic wins (with a score of 5-0).

See also
 2006 Asian Games
 FESPIC Games

References

External links
Official Website of the 15th Asian Games in Doha, Qatar

Nations at the 2006 Asian Games
2006
Asian Games